Rahul Prasad can refer to:

 Rahul Prasad (cricketer, born 1982), an Indian cricketer who played for Jharkhand.
 Rahul Prasad (cricketer, born 1993), an Indian cricketer who played for Jharkhand.